is a passenger railway station located in the town of  Miki, Kagawa, Japan.  It is operated by the private transportation company Takamatsu-Kotohira Electric Railroad (Kotoden) and is designated station "N11".

Lines

Layout
The station consists of a single side platform serving one bi-directional track. The station is unattended and there is no station building, but only a shelter on each platform.

Adjacent stations

History
On November 1, 1943 it became  a station on the Takamatsu Kotohira Electric Railway Kotohira Line due to a company merger. It was renamed  on April 10, 1950 and renamed again to its present name on February 1, 1958.

Surrounding area
Faculty of Agriculture, Kagawa University

Passenger statistics

See also
 List of railway stations in Japan

References

External links

  

Railway stations in Japan opened in 1912
Railway stations in Kagawa Prefecture
Miki, Kagawa